East Point is an abandoned settlement on the east of the atoll of Diego Garcia in the British Indian Ocean Territory. It was the largest civilian settlement in the archipelago, and served as the administrative capital until the depopulation of the territory.

The settlement contained a church, cemetery, school, sanatorium in addition to senior management housing. The settlement also contained a post office, which became the plantation warden's office.

History

The settlement was one of four founded during the French rule. Originally named Pointe le Est, it originally served as a coconut plantation.  

Diego Garcia was ceded to the United Kingdom after the Napoleonic wars as part of the Treaty of Paris (1814).

During World War II
In 1942, the British opened RAF Station Diego Garcia and established an advanced flying boat unit at the East Point Plantation, staffed and equipped by No 205 and No 240 Squadrons, then stationed on Ceylon. Both Catalina and Sunderland aircraft were flown during the course of World War II in search of Japanese and German submarines and surface raiders. At Cannon Point, six naval guns were installed by a Royal Marines detachment. In February 1942, the mission was to protect the small Royal Navy base and Royal Air Force station located on the island from Japanese attack.  They were later occupied by Mauritian and Indian Coastal Artillery troops. Following the conclusion of hostilities, the station was closed on 30 April 1946.

After abandonment

Originally, the British Representative resided in East Point, however later moved to the US Base.

Today, the settlement lies in the eastern restricted zone of the island.

References

Geography of the British Indian Ocean Territory